Vice-Admiral James 'Johnny' Johnson   (10 February 1918 – 2 October 1990) was a former Chief of the South African Navy (1 April 1972 to 30 September 1977).
He was nicknamed "Flam" after his wartime red beard - "Vlambaard" in Afrikaans.

Early career
He trained at the General Botha Training college from 1933 to 1934 and joined the P&O Line after leaving General Botha.

He was commissioned in 1938 and joined  in 1939. After his ship was sunk in Suda Bay, Crete, he joined , which took part in the Battle of the Atlantic from 1942 to 1943. During this time he was awarded the Distinguished Service Cross for Gallantry.

SA Navy career
After the war he transferred to the South African Navy in 1946 as a lieutenant commander. He commanded the   when she was delivered from Britain in 1964, in the rank of captain. He was promoted to commodore in 1966.

1969 he was promoted to flag rank and appointed Chief of Naval Staff.

He was appointed Chief of the South African Navy in 1972 and was the last chief to occupy Admiralty House before Naval Headquarters moved to Pretoria.

Awards and decorations

Distinguished Service Cross
The citation in the London Gazette reads:

List

References

South African admirals
Recipients of the Distinguished Service Cross (United Kingdom)
1918 births
1990 deaths
People from Benoni
Chiefs of the South African Navy
South African military personnel of World War II